Lynden may refer to:

Lynden, Washington
Lynden Township, Stearns County, Minnesota
Lynden, Ontario
Lynden Air Cargo, an Alaskan cargo airline 
Lynden family, Belgian nobility

See also
Lyndon (disambiguation)
Linden (disambiguation)
Lindon (disambiguation)